Chase Wright (born June 16, 1989) is an American professional golfer.

Wright was born in Muncie, Indiana. He attended Delta High School where he was a four-time Indiana All-State squad member. Wright won the AJGA Andover Open in 2005. In college, he played golf for Indiana University. In his senior year, Wright was an Academic All-Big Ten selection as well as named to the All-Big Ten First Team. He turned professional in 2012.

Professional history
Wright played in one PGA Tour event in 2012 and finished T64 at The McGladrey Classic.

In 2013, Wright played in the Asian Tour where he made two cuts with his best finish a T22 at the Queen's Cup in Samui, Thailand.

In 2014, Wright made a move to the Web.com Tour.  He played in 24 tournaments, made 12 cuts with 4 top-10 finishes and 7 top-25 finishes.

In 2015, Wright started his second season on the Web.com Tour with a 3rd place finish in the Pacific Rubiales Colombia Championship.

Professional wins (3)

Web.com Tour wins (1)

Web.com Tour playoff record (1–0)

PGA Tour Canada wins (1)

Other wins (1)
2010 Indiana Open

Team appearances
Amateur
 Junior Ryder Cup (representing the United States): 2004

Professional
Aruba Cup (representing PGA Tour Canada): 2017 (winners)

See also
2018 Web.com Tour Finals graduates

References

External links

American male golfers
Indiana Hoosiers men's golfers
PGA Tour golfers
Korn Ferry Tour graduates
Golfers from Indiana
Sportspeople from Bloomington, Indiana
Sportspeople from Muncie, Indiana
1989 births
Living people